Phantom Lake is a small lake inside the city limits of Bellevue, Washington, east of Seattle.  A  pedestrian trail circles the lake, and according to the city government, Bellevue's oldest and largest trees are there.

Historically, Phantom Lake once drained to the north through the Kelsey Creek basin. Nineteenth-century farmer Henry Thode redirected the Phantom Lake outlet to Lake Sammamish, creating Weowna Creek in the process.

Bellevue Airfield, closed in 1983, was nearby to the southwest; the approach to runway 20 was along the lake's southeastern shore.

References

External links

 Phantom Lake at Bellevue Parks and Community Services
 1894 photo of Phantom Lake School
 1939 photo of Phantom Lake

Geography of Bellevue, Washington
Parks in Bellevue, Washington
Lakes of King County, Washington